Sofia Granda is a Guatemalan ten-pin bowler. She finished in 17th position of the combined rankings at the 2006 AMF World Cup. She participated in the 2009 Macau, China International Open Ten-Pin Bowling Championship and is also ranked 2nd throughout Latin American ten-pin bowlers.

References
Results of 2006 AMF World Cup
Results of Macau Championship

Living people
Year of birth missing (living people)
Guatemalan ten-pin bowling players
Place of birth missing (living people)
Pan American Games medalists in bowling
Pan American Games silver medalists for Guatemala
Bowlers at the 2003 Pan American Games
Bowlers at the 2019 Pan American Games
Medalists at the 2003 Pan American Games